Richard Weston may refer to:

Politicians
 Richard de Weston,  MP for Coventry 1295
 Sir Richard Weston (treasurer) (1465–1541), English Sub-Treasurer of the Exchequer, father of Francis Weston who was associated with Anne Boleyn
 Richard Weston (died 1572), MP for Lostwithiel, Saltash, Maldon and Lancaster between 1553 and 1555
 Richard Weston (MP for Petersfield) (1564–1613), MP for Petersfield, 1593
 Richard Weston, 1st Earl of Portland (1577–1635/5), English nobleman and political figure
 Sir Richard Weston (Royalist) (1579–1652), English judge and politician
 Richard Weston (MP for Stafford) (1608/9-1652), Royalist soldier and politician, MP for Stafford (UK Parliament constituency) in 1640
 Richard Weston (died 1681) (1620–1681), English MP

Others
 Sir Richard Weston (canal builder) (1591–1652), English canal builder and agriculturalist
 Richard Weston (botanist) (1733–1806), English botanist
 Richard Weston (architect) (born 1953), architect, writer and professor